Rawalpindi is a city in the Punjab province of Pakistan. Rawalpindi may also refer to:

Places
 Rawalpindi Division, a third-tier administrative subdivision in Punjab, Pakistan 
 Rawalpindi District, a district in Punjab, Pakistan encompassing the city of Rawalpindi and surrounding areas
 Rawalpindi Tehsil, a subdivision of Rawalpindi District encompassing the city of Rawalpindi
 Rawalpindi Cantonment, a military cantonment in the city of Rawalpindi
 Rawalpindi, Kapurthala, a village in Kapurthala district, Punjab, India

Other
 , a British Royal Navy ship that was sunk during World War II
 Rawalpindi cricket team, a first-class cricket side

See also